The Dragon Man is a 1999 crime novel by the Australian author Garry Disher.

Awards

Deutscher Krimi Preis (German Crime Fiction Award), International, 2002: winner

Notes

This is the first novel in the author's "Challis/Destry" series of crime novels, followed by Kittyhawk Down (2003), Snapshot (2005), Chain of Evidence (2007), and Blood Moon (2009).

Reviews

"Australian Crime Fiction Database" 
"Washington Post" 

Australian crime novels
1999 Australian novels
Allen & Unwin books